The Iceland School of Energy (ISE; Icelandic: Islenski Orkuhaskólinn) is an international graduate school within the Department of Engineering at Reykjavik University, the largest private university in Iceland. ISE is jointly owned by Reykjavik Energy, Reykjavik University, and Iceland GeoSurvey, and specialises in the fields of Sustainable Energy and Electric Power.

History
In April 2007, Reykjavik Energy, Reykjavik University and the University of Iceland signed an agreement to establish an international graduate programme for Sustainable Energy studies. The school was named the Reykjavik Energy Graduate School for Sustainable Systems (REYST). REYST's inaugural class began their studies in August 2008, and graduated in February 2010 from the 18-month program. In early 2013, the REYST programme was restructured into the Iceland School of Energy to include a new partner, the Icelandic GeoSurvey (ÍSOR). In addition to the permanent partners, Reykjavik Energy and ÍSOR, ISE has active collaborations with institutions both domestically and internationally including Landsvirkjun, Landsnet, Orkustofnun, Arctic Circle (organization), Tufts University´s Fletcher School and The GREEN Program.

ISE expanded their area of expertise in 2018 to include studies in electric power systems. In doing so, Reykjavik University's MSc in Electrical Engineering was divided into two degrees: an MSc in Mechatronics Engineering, and an MSc in Electric Power Engineering, with the latter taken under the domain of ISE.

Programmes
Building on expertise founded through faculty, industry partners and collaborators, ISE offers graduate programmes in the fields of Sustainable Energy and Electric Power. Each programme is 120 ECTS and requires two years to complete, culminating in a master's thesis defence.

Sustainable energy 

Building on this goal, ISE offers programmes in Sustainable Energy Science and Engineering. Students in these programmes have historically focused on the following research areas: geothermal engineering and exploration, wind energy research, economics, policy, and business. ISE research projects in Sustainable Energy often serve as platforms for inter-departmental collaboration across disciplines within the energy sector. Students have in the past taken courses outside the Department of Energy, including the Department of Law and the Department of Business Administration. ISE graduate students have presented research at the Stanford Geothermal Congress, the Tufts Fletcher School´s Resolving the Arctic Paradox Conference, the Arctic Circle Assembly, and the World Geothermal Congress in Melbourne, Australia.

The Sustainable Energy Engineering programme meets the curriculum requirements for the professional title of chartered engineer, as defined by the Ministry of Industry and the Association of Chartered Engineers in Iceland (Icelandic: Verkfræðingur). After successful completion of the programme the student is awarded the degree Master of Science in Sustainable Energy Engineering, and is eligible to apply for the title of Chartered Engineer in Iceland.

Electric power 
Increased research interest in the area of power systems and smart grids prompted the formal formation of the Electric Power programmes, both in engineering and management. Research conducted in this domain has been closely tied to the Icelandic power system, both on the transmission and distribution level.

The Electric Power Engineering programme meets the curriculum requirements for the professional title of chartered engineer, as defined by the Ministry of Industry and the Association of Chartered Engineers in Iceland (Icelandic: Verkfræðingur). After successful completion of the programme the student is awarded the degree Master of Science in Electric Power Engineering, and is eligible to apply for the title of Chartered Engineer in Iceland.

Campus 
The Iceland School of Energy operates within Reykjavik University's Nauthólsvík campus.

Student residences 
As of August 2020, Reykjavik University opened their student housing complex.

Faculty
The Faculty and Staff of ISE include scientists from Reykjavik Energy, ÍSOR, Reykjavik University and the University of Iceland.  Students attend courses at Reykjavik University as well as at Iceland GeoSurvey and other collaborators' headquarters.

Gallery

See also
 Reykjavik University
 Reykjavik Energy
 Iceland GeoSurvey

References

Universities in Iceland
International universities
Renewable energy in Iceland
Educational institutions established in 2008
2008 establishments in Iceland